Kotelniki is a town of Moscow Oblast, Russia, located  southeast of the center of Moscow. Population:

History
The village of Kotelniki was first mentioned in the 17th century and belonged to Golitsyns in the 19th century. It was granted town status in 2004.

Administrative and municipal status
Within the framework of administrative divisions, it is incorporated as Kotelniki Town Under Oblast Jurisdiction—an administrative unit with the status equal to that of the districts. As a municipal division, Kotelniki Town Under Oblast Jurisdiction is incorporated as Kotelniki Urban Okrug.

Economy

Transportation
Kotelniki metro station, the terminus of the Moscow Metro's Tagansko-Krasnopresnenskaya Line, is located in the city. It was opened on 21 September 2015 and became the second station of the Moscow Metro in Moscow Oblast after Myakinino.

Gallery

Notable residents 

Nikolay Abramov (born 1950), football player

References

Notes

Sources

Cities and towns in Moscow Oblast